, Virginia Military Institute alumni include the current Governor of Virginia, the current Secretary of the Army, a Secretary of State, Secretary of Defense, two Lieutenant Governors of Virginia, a Nobel Peace Prize winner, Pulitzer Prize winners, 13 Rhodes Scholars, Medal of Honor recipients, an Academy Award winner, an Emmy Award and Golden Globe winner, a martyr recognized by the Episcopal Church, Senators and Representatives, Governors, Lieutenant Governors, a Supreme Court Justice, numerous college and university presidents, many business leaders (presidents and CEOs) and over 285 general and flag officers, including service chiefs for three of the four armed services.

Two recent Chiefs of Engineers of the Army Corps of Engineers, Lieutenant Generals Carl A. Strock and Robert B. Flowers, as well as Acting Chief of Engineers Major General "Bo" Temple, were VMI Civil Engineering graduates.

VMI alumni include:

Military

Government and politics

Arts and entertainment

Sports

Others

References

Virginia Military Institute alumni